Gaujiena Palace is a palace in the historical region of Vidzeme, in northern Latvia.

History 
It was built between 1850 and 1860 in late Classical style. The six-column portico was added later. Since 1922 the palace has housed the Gaujiena comprehensive secondary school (Gaujienas ģimnāzija).

See also
Gaujiena Castle
List of palaces and manor houses in Latvia

References

External links
  Gaujiena Palace

Palaces in Latvia
Smiltene Municipality
Vidzeme